Statistics of Belgian First Division in the 1921–22 season.

Overview

It was contested by 14 teams, and Beerschot won the championship.

League standings

Results

References

Belgian Pro League seasons
Belgian
Belgian First Division